Stenodesmus is a genus of mosses belonging to the family Daltoniaceae.

Its native range is Southern America.

Species:

Stenodesmus tenuicuspis

References

Moss genera
Hookeriales